B. gouldii may refer to:

 Breviceps gouldii, a frog species in the genus Breviceps
 Buccinum gouldii, a sea snail species

See also
 Gouldii (disambiguation)